Ascent Flight Training is a flight training company set up as a joint venture between Lockheed Martin and Babcock International to deliver flying training to pilots and aircrew from the three services of the UK Armed Forces as part of a Private Finance Initiative (PFI).

UK Military Flying Training System (UKMFTS) 

Ascent was chosen to deliver the £3.2 billion UKMFTS contract over 25 years, training military aircrew from the Army Air Corps, Fleet Air Arm and Royal Air Force up to their respective Operational Conversion Units.

Ascent is responsible for delivering:
Fixed wing training at RAF Cranwell and RAF Valley
Rotary training at RAF Shawbury and RAF Valley.

See also
 UK Military Flying Training System

References

Aviation companies
Flight training in the United Kingdom
Training organizations